Wilbur T. "Bill" Mohr (29 June 1909 – 29 March 1971) was an Australian rules footballer who represented St Kilda in the Victorian Football League (VFL) during the 1930s.

Career 
Playing as a half-back flanker initially, Mohr later became one of the league's greatest full-forwards; he kicked 101 goals in 1936 (the first St Kilda player to kick more than 100 goals in a season) and was the VFL Leading Goalkicker in that year.

Mohr possessed an ability to kick straight from any angle, and he was one of the best exponents of the drop kick. He was appointed captain of St Kilda in 1937, and was the club's leading goalkicker in every season from 1929 to 1940. It was announced that at the start of his final season, 1941, he would play in defence. But in May that year, after having only played one game for the season, Mohr announced his retirement, saying that he felt he could not reach form and that it was also time to make way for a younger player.

In 1947, Essendon champion Dick Reynolds, in an article for the now-defunct Melbourne newspaper The Argus, wrote about Mohr that:
[He] was handicapped because he played with a team that had few successes. He was a clever position player, grand trier, and a remarkably straight kick.

In 1955, in an interview with The Argus, former South Melbourne champion Laurie Nash echoed similar sentiments about Mohr:
Bill Mohr was hampered by playing with a comparatively weak St. Kilda combination. In a stronger team he might easily have qualified for a higher place in full forward rankings. An extremely heady player, he was an accurate kick and dependable mark.

Posthumous honours 
Mohr was one of the first players inducted into the Australian Football Hall of Fame in 1996.

In St Kilda's Team of the Century, he was named on the half-forward flank to accommodate Tony Lockett at full-forward.

References

External links

Profile at Australian Football

1909 births
1971 deaths
Australian rules footballers from New South Wales
St Kilda Football Club players
Trevor Barker Award winners
VFL Leading Goalkicker Medal winners
Australian Football Hall of Fame inductees
Sportspeople from Wagga Wagga